Higinbotham Province was an electorate of the Victorian Legislative Council. It existed as a two-member electorate from 1937 to 2006, with members serving alternating eight-year terms. It was considered a safe seat for the Liberal throughout its history, though it was won by Labor candidate Noel Pullen in Labor's landslide victory at the 2002 state election. It was abolished from the 2006 state election in the wake of the Bracks Labor government's reform of the Legislative Council.

It was located in the south-east of Melbourne. In 2002, when it was last contested, it covered an area of 108 km2 and included the suburbs of Bentleigh, Black Rock, Brighton, Cheltenham, Mentone, Moorabbin, Mordialloc and Sandringham.

Members for Higinbotham Province

Election results

References

Former electoral provinces of Victoria (Australia)
1937 establishments in Australia
2006 disestablishments in Australia